Jon Roper (born ) is an English former professional rugby league footballer who played as a  and  in the 1990s and 2000s.

He played at representative level for Cumbria and England, and at club level for Warrington Wolves, London Broncos, Salford City Reds, Castleford Tigers, Leigh Centurions, Rochdale Hornets, Halifax, Oldham and Workington Town.

International honours
Roper won a cap for England while at Warrington in 1999 against France. Roper also toured with Great Britain in 1996.

Genealogical information
Jon Roper is the son of the rugby league  who played in the 1980s for Workington Town; Tony Roper, and the grandson of the rugby league footballer; Sol Roper.

References

External links
Statistics at wolvesplayers.thisiswarrington.co.uk

1976 births
Living people
Castleford Tigers players
Cumbria rugby league team players
England national rugby league team players
English rugby league players
Halifax R.L.F.C. players
Leigh Leopards players
London Broncos players
Oldham R.L.F.C. players
Place of birth missing (living people)
Rochdale Hornets players
Rugby league centres
Rugby league five-eighths
Rugby league fullbacks
Rugby league locks
Rugby league players from Workington
Rugby league wingers
Salford Red Devils players
Warrington Wolves players
Workington Town players